The Dhuwal are an indigenous Australian people of Arnhem Land in the Northern Territory

Language
Dhuwal belongs to the Yolŋu-Matha branch of the Pama-Nyungan language family

Country
The Dhuwal were described by Norman Tindale in 1974 as one of two groups of clans (mala), the other being the Dhuwala, both living predominantly in the coastal area facing the Arafura Sea, and inhabiting the east Arnhem land coastal area reaching from Castlereagh Bay, Buckingham River, and the Koolatong River to the vicinity of Port Bradshaw. In 1927 the missionary J. C. Jennison wrote down a list of some 900 words he heard from the indigenous people of Elcho Island, and modern linguistic analysis indicates that this word-list consists of vocabulary from the Dhuwal language. The implication is that Dhuwal estates also existed on that island.

History of contact
The first European to come in contact with the Dhuwal, the Balamumu (seafolk/coastal people) at Caledon Bay, was Matthew Flinders. Two were shot dead in skirmishes. A short word-list was compiled of their language.

Social organization
Dhuwal society is organized in terms of 8 clans, all belonging to the Dua moiety of the Yirritja/Dia binome.
 1. Tjambarupingu.
 2. Leiagawumir.
 3. Leiagalawumir. (Leyagalawumirr, Liaalaomir, Laigalawumiri, Laigulawulmiree).
 4. Datiwui. (Datiwuy).
 5. Marangu. (Marrangu, Marrakuli, Merango).
 6. Marakulu. (Marrakulu, Maragulu).
 7. Djapu.
 8. Dapuingu.

Alternative names
 Balamumu (southern exonym for the coastal tribes around Caledon Bay, meaning 'sea/coastal folk'.)
 Barlamomo, Barlamumu
 Malag. (from the word mala, meaning 'sea.')
 Marlark
 Arrawiya
 Banjarrpuma
 Bilamandji
 Dhurili. (mainly used of clans to the south)
 Durilji

Notes

Citations

Sources

Yolngu